Hilton Thon Mauro Moreira, a.k.a. Thon Moreira or Thon Thomas (born February 27, 1981, in Pindamonhangaba, São Paulo) is a Brazilian former footballer who plays as a forward.

In May 2013, Sriwijaya and Persib Bandung agreed to exchange players. Dzumafo (to Sriwijaya) and Hilton (to Persib) eventually exchanged. In December 2013, Hilton made a shock move to a M-League 2 team, Penang FA after impress in a pre-season match against Kelantan FA where the team won 2–0.

Honours
Sriwijaya
Indonesia Super League: 2011–12

References

External links
 Hilton Mauro Moreira at Liga-Indonesia.co.id
 

Brazilian footballers
Badak Lampung F.C. players
1981 births
People from Pindamonhangaba
Liga 1 (Indonesia) players
Liga 2 (Indonesia) players
Sriwijaya F.C. players
Deltras F.C. players
Persipura Jayapura players
Persib Bandung players
Mixto Esporte Clube players
Sociedade Esportiva Palmeiras players
Expatriate footballers in Indonesia
Brazilian expatriates in Indonesia
Penang F.C. players
Expatriate footballers in Malaysia
Brazilian expatriates in Malaysia
Association football forwards
Association football wingers
Living people
Footballers from São Paulo (state)